A lantern is a portable lighting device used to illuminate broad areas.

Lantern or Lanterns may also refer to:
 Roof lantern, an architectural term to describe a structure above a dome, or other roof, with openings to admit light or air
 Stage lighting instrument used in theatre and television
 A large window above a stage, used before stage lighting to illuminate the action
 The structure enclosing the light and lens of a lighthouse
 "Lantern" (Better Call Saul), an episode of Better Call Saul
 Lantern frame, a machine used to wind  cotton in an Arkwright-type mill
 Lantern (software), a free peer-to-peer internet censorship circumvention software
 Lantern, primary search platform of the Media History Digital Library
 Lantern (horse), Australian racehorse and winner of the 1864 Melbourne Cup

Music
 Lantern (Clogs album), 2006
 Lantern (Hudson Mohawke album), 2015
 Lanterns (Son Lux album), 2013
 Lanterns (A Very Loud Death album), 2017
 Lanterns (36 Crazyfists album), 2017
 Lanterns (song), a song by Birds of Tokyo
 "Lantern", a 2018 track by Toby Fox from Deltarune Chapter 1 OST from the video game Deltarune

See also
 Cage gear, also called a lantern gear or lantern pinion. A type of gear with cylindrical rods for teeth
 Chinese lantern (disambiguation)
 Green Lantern, a fictional DC Comics superhero
 Lanterns of the Dead, an architectural name for the small towers in stone found chiefly in the center and west of France
 The Lanterns, small Tasmanian islands, Australia
 The Lantern (disambiguation)